Phenacomyini is a tribe of voles in the subfamily Arvicolinae. It contains five species in two genera, all of which are found in North America.

Species in this tribe are:

 Genus Arborimus - tree voles
 White-footed vole, A. albipes
 Red tree vole, A. longicaudus
 Sonoma tree vole, A. pomo
 Genus Phenacomys - heather voles
 Western heather vole, P. intermedius
 Eastern heather vole, P. ungava
The fossil taxa Hibbardomys and Paraphenacomys likely also belong to this tribe. 

The phylogenetic affinities of this tribe have been disputed; some authors have classified them as belonging in the same clade as Arvicolini and Myodini, while others ally them with the otherwise Arctic tribe Dicrostonychini and place them outside the clade containing other voles. A 2021 phylogenetic study found Phenacomyini to form a sister group to Dicrostonychini and synonymized it with them.

References 

Voles and lemmings
Mammal tribes